Hokkaido Prefecture had 14 branch offices called 支庁 (shichō) in Japanese, which is often translated in English as subprefectures. Normally, a subprefecture consists of a few to a dozen cities, towns, and/or villages. From April 2010, Hokkaido has 9 General Subprefectural Bureaus (総合振興局, sōgō-shinkō-kyoku, literally "Comprehensive Promotion Bureau") and 5 Subprefectural Bureaus (振興局, shinkō-kyoku, literally "Promotion Bureau")).

For historical reasons, some older people in Hokkaido use the subprefecture name suffixed by -kannai in their address.

History

List of subprefectures

Reorganization
The prefectural government of Hokkaido planned to reorganize the current 14 subprefectures into 9 subprefectural bureaus. Five subprefectures, namely Hidaka, Hiyama, Ishikari, Nemuro, and Rumoi were subject to be cut down. The capital municipalities of these subprefectures opposed the plan, but on June 28, 2008, the prefectural council passed the ordinance of the reorganization. The change should have taken effect in April 2009.

However, it was impossible to make the reform on time. The Public Offices Election Act and the Election Law were not amended on April 1, 2009, but the amendment the Public Offices Election Act was passed in the prefectural assembly on March 31, 2009 and took effect from April 1, 2010.

List of subprefectural bureaus
Sorachi General Subprefectural Bureau (空知総合振興局), Iwamizawa, covering Ishikari and Sorachi areas. (Horokanai belongs to Kamikawa Subprefectural Bureau.)
Ishikari Subprefectural Bureau (石狩振興局), Sapporo, covering Ishikari area
Shiribeshi General Subprefectural Bureau (後志総合振興局), Kutchan, covering Shiribeshi area
Iburi General Subprefectural Bureau (胆振総合振興局), Muroran, covering Iburi and Hidaka areas
Hidaka Subprefectural Bureau (日高振興局), Urakawa, covering Hidaka area
Oshima General Subprefectural Bureau (渡島総合振興局), Hakodate, covering Oshima and Hiyama areas
Hiyama Subprefectural Bureau (檜山振興局), Esashi, covering Hiyama area
Kamikawa General Subprefectural Bureau (上川総合振興局), Asahikawa, covering Kamikawa and Rumoi areas
Rumoi Subprefectural Bureau (留萌振興局), Rumoi, covering Rumoi area. (Horonobe belongs to Soya Subprefectural Bureau.)
Sōya General Subprefectural Bureau (宗谷総合振興局), Wakkanai, covering Sōya area
Okhotsk General Subprefectural Bureau (オホーツク総合振興局), Abashiri, covering Abashiri area
Tokachi General Subprefectural Bureau (十勝総合振興局), Obihiro, covering Tokachi area
Kushiro General Subprefectural Bureau (釧路総合振興局), Kushiro, covering Kushiro and Nemuro areas
Nemuro Subprefectural Bureau (根室振興局), Nemuro, covering Nemuro area

References

External links
 Official websites of the subprefectural bureaus 
 The map of the new development bureaus, from Pucchi Guide